Ella Mae Lentz (born May 5, 1954) is a Deaf American author, poet, teacher, and advocate.

Biography 
Lentz was born in Berkeley, California, to two deaf parents. Her brother was also deaf.

Lentz graduated from the California School for the Deaf (currently the California School for the Deaf, Fremont) in Berkeley in 1971. After graduating, she attended Gallaudet University where she received dual bachelor's degrees in Drama and English, graduating in 1975.

Lentz has done research on American Sign Language (ASL) at several research institutions, including Northeastern University in Boston, the Salk Institute in San Diego, and the University of California, San Francisco.

ASL Presents was founded by Lentz in 2007, located in Hayward, California. The company focuses on the how to coach, consult, present, perform, and teach ASL and Deaf Culture curriculum.

Written production 
Lentz has developed training material as well as educational material such as:
 National Consortium of Programs for the Training of Sign Language Instructors (NCPTSLI): Lentz developed and tested the curricula for this project as well as recruited and trained the instructors. This project was a grant project combined with the National Association of the Deaf, with the hopes of reforming ASL instruction.
 The Signing Naturally Curriculum Series, which is a best-seller (Lentz was a co-author). The series was given a three-year federal grant through the Funds for Improvement of Post Secondary Education, and was produced in hopes to teach ASL as a second language. Today many schools use this series as their textbooks for their ASL classes in high school as well as college.
 The Deafhood Foundation.

Productions 

 The PBS children's television show Rainbow's End.
 A televised talk show in 1974 called Silent Perspectives
 Dennis Cokely and Charlotte Baker's ASL curriculum known as "The Green Books".
 Starred in a Milwaukee Repertory production of Children of a Lesser God in 1982, playing the leading role of Sarah Norman.

Poetry 
Lentz is widely known in the deaf community for her poetry. Many people have analyzed and studied her poems.

 The Treasure: Poems by Ella Mae Lentz
 
 The Poem "The Door"
 video poems

Recognition 

 On August 27, 2009, Ella was honored by the Purple Communications as one of the ten finalists for its "Dream Bigger Campaign".
 She is recognized for her achievements as well as her contributions to the Deaf community by being appointed a member of the California Association of the Deaf as a member of the board of directors.
 She was also recognized for her achievements as a "Famous Alumna" at the California School for the Deaf.
 She was also awarded the Kappa Gamma Poetry Award at Gallaudet University.
 She is a part of the Deaf Bilingual Coalition.

Family
Lentz' partner is Judy D. Gough. They have five children, the youngest being Deaf, and ten grandchildren, of whom three are Deaf.

References

External links
 Abe., Debby. "Deaf Studies: Teenagers Discuss 'deafhood', May 2009 | Deaf Studies- Ohlone College, Fremont, Newark, East Bay Area, California." Ohlone College Official Website, A World of Cultures United in Learning- Ohlone College, Fremont, Newark, East Bay Area, California. 20 May 2009. Web. 08 Dec. 2011. http://www.ohlone.edu/instr/deafstudies/20090520teenagersdiscuss-ggertz.html. Workshops that Ella and Gertz have both held.
 Baer, Joey, Judy Gough, Brenda Faliger, Linda Slovick, Trudy Sluggs, and Joyce Brubaker. "About – Ella." ASL Presents. Ava Moon Studios, 2010. Web. 08 Dec. 2011. http://www.aslpresents.com/ella.html. This website provides information on Ella's life, what she does, what she stands for, and who she supports. The entire website is dedicated to her and provides videos as well.
 Browning, Paula. "ASL Teachers." Coda 365. 2010. Web. 08 Dec. 2011. https://web.archive.org/web/20120426050217/http://www.coda365.org/coda/Vote.html. in Depth bibliography on Ella Mae lentz life.
 "Deaf Protest at the Italian Consulate in San Francisco." Deafbayarea.com. 25 May 2011. Web. 08 Dec. 2011. https://web.archive.org/web/20110811111511/http://deafbayarea.com/deaf-protest-at-the-italian-consulate-in-san-francisco/. This is about the protest that Ella Mae Lentz help led for the deaf protest at the Italian Consulate in San Francisco.
 "Dream Bigger: Ella Mae Lentz | Facebook." Welcome to Facebook – Log In, Sign Up or Learn More. Facebook. Web. 08 Dec. 2011. https://www.facebook.com/media/set/?set=a.127838494161.103173.42541479161. Facebook pictures of Ella at the Purple convention .
 "Ella Mae Lentz | Flickr – Photo Sharing!" Welcome to Flickr – Photo Sharing. Web. 08 Dec. 2011. https://www.flickr.com/photos/purplecomm/5759287021/. Pictures of Ella at the purple convention.
 "Ella Mae Lentz." San Diego American Sign Language Teacher Association. Web. 08 Dec. 2011. http://www.sandiegoaslta.org/events/bios/ella.html. This website is the bibliography of Ella Mae Lentz.
 "Free Community Screening: Deaf Jam : Indybay." San Francisco Bay Area Independent Media Center. 06 Oct. 2011. Web. 08 Dec. 2011. http://www.indybay.org/newsitems/2011/10/06/18692461.php. Event Ella did.. She did a Q & A
 Gmelch, Sharon. "Gender on Campus: Issues for College ... – Sharon Gmelch, Marcie Heffernan Stoffer, Jody Lynn Yetzer." Google Books. Web. 08 Dec. 2011. https://books.google.com/books?id=woWrlr64OJwC. It is a reference to a book that she is in (might be a video).
 Lentz, Ella Mae. The Treasure. San Diego: Dawn Sign, 2006. RIT Libraries. Web. 8 Dec. 2011. http://albert.rit.edu/record=b2721741~S3.
 "People behind the Foundation." Deaf Hood. Web. 08 Dec. 2011. http://www.deafhoodfoundation.org/Deafhood/Board.html. This website talks about her definition of Deafhood and also a little about herself.
 "Purple Communications Invites Greater San Ramon Community to Celebrate Ms. Ella Mae Lentz, Finalist in 'Dream Bigger' Initiative." The Free Library. Gale, Cengage Learning., 2009. Web. 2 Dec. 2011. http://www.thefreelibrary.com/Purple+Communications+Invites+Greater+San+Ramon+Community+to...-a0206103878. About Ella and her contribution to Purple.
 "River of Words – Art and Poetry." River of Words – Home. River of Words, 2011. Web. 08 Dec. 2011. http://www.riverofwords.org/contest_judges.html. She was listed here as a poetry contest judge. It also explains a little bit about herself.
 Savage, John. "Deafhood Monologues at CSUN." Deafhood Monologues at CSUN. 23 Apr. 2010. Web. 5 Dec. 2011. http://lenois.com/search/mae/feed/rss2/. vblogs on presentations that Ella has done.
 "Sustainability | Saint Mary's College." Home Page | Saint Mary's College. St. Mary's Road, 1928. Web. 08 Dec. 2011. https://web.archive.org/web/20120207130316/http://www.stmarys-ca.edu/tags/sustainability. A short bibliography on Ella as an ASL contest judge.

1954 births
Living people
American women writers
American deaf actresses
Deaf writers
21st-century American women